Felix and the Treasure of Morgäa is a Canadian computer-animated adventure family film, directed by Nicola Lemay and released in 2021. The film centres on Felix, a 12-year-old boy who has been living with his mother on the Magdalen Islands since his father's failure to return from a voyage to find treasure on the Island of Eternal Night; when his mother goes off on vacation and leaves him and his infant sister, Mia, in the care of their aunt, he enlists the help of lighthouse keeper Tom to travel to the island in search of his father.

The film's French voice cast includes Karine Vanasse, Gabriel Lessard, Guy Nadon, Marc Labrèche, Catherine Proulx-Lemay, Éveline Gélinas, Louis Lacombe-Petrowski, Antoine Durand, Tristan Harvey, Kim Jalabert, Geneviève Bédard, Frédéric Desager, Jean-François Beaupré and Jérôme Boiteau, while its English voice cast includes Vanasse, Boiteau, Daniel Brochu, Vlasta Vrána, Holly Gauthier-Frankel, Angela Galuppo, Wyatt Bowen, Terrence Scammell, Richard M. Dumont, Arthur Holden, Marcel Jeannin, Mark Camacho, Elizabeth Neale and Eleanor Noble.

Lemay originally conceived the project as a graphic novel, before instead pitching it to 10th Ave Productions as an animated film. The film premiered on February 26, 2021 as the opening film of the Montreal International Children's Film Festival, before being released commercially in both English and French. In advance of the film's release, children's author Édith Bourget published a novelization of the film.

The film received two Prix Iris nominations at the 23rd Quebec Cinema Awards in 2021, for Best First Film and the Public Prize.

References

External links

2021 films
2021 adventure films
2021 computer-animated films
2020s children's adventure films
2020s children's animated films
2020s English-language films
2020s French-language films
Canadian computer-animated films
Canadian children's animated films
Quebec films
Sea adventure films
Treasure hunt films
Animated adventure films
Works adapted into novels
English-language Canadian films
Animated films about children
Animated films about siblings
Animated films about families
Pirate films
Animated films about cats
Fictional parrots
Films set in Montreal
Animated films set on islands
Magdalen Islands
Films set on ships
Films set in 2021
Films impacted by the COVID-19 pandemic
2020s Canadian films
2010s Canadian films
Canadian children's adventure films